A Dispatch from Reuters  is a 1940 biographical film about Paul Reuter, the man who built the famous news service that bears his name.

Story behind Reuters
Paul Reuter starts a messenger service using homing pigeons to fill a gap in the telegraph network spanning Europe, but has difficulty convincing anyone to subscribe. When poison is sent to a hospital by mistake, Reuter's message saves the day (and many lives). However, he is persuaded by Ida Magnus, the pretty daughter of Dr. Magnus, to keep it quiet, as a scandal would undo all the good work the doctors are doing.

Finally though, with some hot news about Russia invading Hungary (which would depress the stock market), Reuter is able to convince bankers that he can provide them with financial information much more quickly than any other means. He is particularly pleased and surprised by how reliable his lifelong, lackadaisical friend Max Wagner has become at the Brussels office, until his associate Franz Geller informs him that Ida had, while there on a visit, taken over and run the place. Reuter sends a message by pigeon, asking her to marry him. She sends one back with her assent.

When the telegraph network finally fills the gap Reuter's business had been exploiting, he realizes that he can use the employees he has in place all over Europe to gather the news and sell it to the newspapers. Once again, he encounters resistance, particularly from John Delane, influential editor of The Times, but overcomes it by persuading Louis Napoleon III to allow him to disseminate the text of an extremely important speech at the same time as it is being presented.

Later, a rival company appears; Anglo Irish secretly builds a telegraph line in Ireland that gives it a two-hour lead in getting news from ships coming from America. Reuter borrows money from his client and good friend, Sir Randolph Persham, and builds his own line, one that extends further west and gets the news even quicker. Its first use is to announce the assassination of President Lincoln. As nobody knows about Reuter's new telegraph line, he is accused of making the tragedy up in order to manipulate the stock market; even Sir Randolph believes the rumors at first. The matter is brought up in the British Parliament, but Reuter is vindicated when slower services confirm his story.

Cast
Edward G. Robinson as Paul Julius Reuter
Edna Best as Ida Magnus Reuter
Eddie Albert as Max Wagner
Albert Bassermann as Franz Geller
Gene Lockhart as Otto Bauer
Otto Kruger as Dr. Magnus
Nigel Bruce as Sir Randolph Persham
Montagu Love as John Delane
James Stephenson as Carew
Walter Kingsford as Louis Napoleon III
David Bruce as Mr. Bruce
Dickie Moore as Reuter as a Boy 
Lumsden Hare as Chairman 
Cyril Delevanti as Cockney News Vendor (uncredited) 
Gilbert Emery as Lord Palmerston (uncredited) 
Robert Homans as Reporter (uncredited)

Notes

External links

 
 

1940 films
Films about journalists
American black-and-white films
Films directed by William Dieterle
Films set in Brussels
Films set in Germany
Films set in London
Films set in Paris
Films set in the 1840s
Films set in the 1850s
Films set in the 1860s
Films about mass media owners
American biographical drama films
1940s biographical drama films
1940s historical drama films
American historical drama films
Warner Bros. films
1940s American films